Iranian Agriculture News Agency (IANA) is an Iranian Official news agency focused on agricultural issues of the world countries and introduces that of Iran to the world. Its start dates back to May 2004 with the goal of specialized activities on Agriculture and Rural Development and to help the national network of informing to develop in agriculture sector and to provide information for beneficiaries and specialists and to attend between other written electronic media, offering solving suggestions and establish a dynamic and productive connection with the public thoughts in and out of Iran in order to extend the macro and micro agricultural policies.
On the other hand, reflecting the agriculture sector and its related subsections' capacities and abilities especially in social affairs, democratic organizations and the culture of village are among the other activities of this predicative-analytic news agency.

Management 

The managing director of this news agency is Kazem Shokri.

Journalists 

49 journalists are working in IANA including 9 deskmen who manage their subordinate groups, such as editing and publishing the provided news, reports, articles and critiques on the website.

Groups 

Currently eight news groups plus the Technical and Support group are working in IANA and nine deskmen take control of them. The groups are as follows:
 Agriculture
 Economy
 Rural Development and Industries
 Research and Study
 International
 Non-Government Organizations
 Parliament
 Culture and Art
 Picture

External links
Official English website of IANA
Alt Official English website of IANA
Official Persian website of IANA
Alt Official Persian website of IANA

News agencies based in Iran